St. Giles' Church is a church in North Oxford, England. It is at the northern end of the wide thoroughfare of St Giles', at the point where it meets Woodstock Road and Banbury Road. It stands between where Little Clarendon Street joins Woodstock Road and Keble Road joins Banbury Road.

The church was built in the 12th and 13th centuries.

Oxford's main war memorial adjoins the southern end of St. Giles' churchyard.

Foundation, dedication and building
The church was first mentioned in the Domesday Book of 1086, where it was recorded that the owner of the land north of the city intended to build a Norman church there. The church was built for one Edwin, son of Godegose and finished in 1120. In 1139, Edwin granted the church and all its property to the then newly created Benedictine Godstow Abbey,  to the northwest.

There were no other buildings between it and the city wall, where the St Michael at the North Gate church stands. About a thousand people lived within the walls of Oxford at this time.

The church was not actually consecrated until 1200, by Saint Hugh, Bishop of Lincoln. There is a 13th- or 14th-century consecration cross consisting of interlaced circles cut into the western column of the bell tower that is believed to commemorate this. Also in commemoration of the consecration, St Giles' Fair was established. The fair continues to this day, held on the Monday and Tuesday after the Sunday following 1 September, which is St Giles' Day. St Hugh also expanded the St Mary Magdalen's Church to the south in 1194.

Surviving 12th-century features of the church include two windows in the north side of the clerestory of the nave and the lower parts of the bell tower. The tower was finished early in the 13th century, which is the date of the aisle arcades and Early English Gothic lancet windows as well. The Decorated Gothic chancel was built late in the 13th century.

During and after the Reformation
Godstow Abbey surrendered St Giles' church and all its lands to the Crown in 1539 during the dissolution of the monasteries. In 1542 the Crown granted St Giles' to Dr George Owen of Godstow, a physician of King Henry VIII. In 1573 his son Richard Owen sold St. Giles to Sir Thomas White, Lord Mayor of London, who in 1555 had refounded the Cistercian house of St Bernard on the east side of St Giles' Street as St John's College. Sir Thomas granted St Giles' to St John's, which since then has held the advowson of the parish. Incumbents of St. Giles' have included two notable Laudians: William Juxon from 1610 to 1615 and Thomas Turner from 1624 to 1629.

Monuments in St. Giles' church include figurines of Henry Bosworth (died 1634), his wife Alice and their three children. They seem to have been made for a tomb that has not survived. St. Giles' church was damaged during the English Civil War, in which the Parliamentarian army besieged the Royalist force defending Charles I in Oxford. John Goad, vicar from 1644 until 1646, is said to have led services in St. Giles during Parliamentary artillery bombardments of Oxford in 1645. The Civil War may have been when the Bosworth tomb was destroyed.

St. Giles' church building received only minor repairs during the 17th and 18th centuries. At different times in the 19th century parts of the building were repaired and the chapel on the south side of the chancel was partly rebuilt.

The benefice since the 19th century

Oxford has expanded over time, so St Giles' church is now relatively central within the city. As north Oxford was built up and its population grew, new parishes were created out of parts of St. Giles'. They included St Philip and St James', consecrated in 1862 and St. Margaret's, consecrated as a daughter church of SS. Philip and James in 1883. St. Giles remains a separate ecclesiastical parish but is now reunited with the parish of St Philip and St James with St Margaret in a united benefice.

Bells
The bell tower has a ring of eight bells. The oldest bell is the tenor, cast by Ellis Knight I of Reading, Berkshire in 1632. Five more were cast by William Taylor, presumably at the Taylor family's then Oxford bell-foundry, in 1850: the same year as the rebuilding of St. Giles south chapel was begun. St. Giles' youngest bells are the treble and second, cast in 1927 by Mears and Stainbank at the Whitechapel Bell Foundry in the East End of London.

See also
 St Giles' Fair, held each September on St Giles' south of the church
 St Mary Magdalen's Church, to the south
 St Michael at the Northgate, also to the south, Oxford's oldest building
 Edward Drax Free, vicar

References

Sources

External links
Oxford History: St Giles' Church, Oxford in 1834
St Giles' Church – Oxford on Flickr
Photos of the cemetery outside St. Giles' Church, Oxford, on September 2, 2008

1200 establishments in England

Churches completed in 1120
Saint Giles
Saint Giles
Grade I listed churches in Oxfordshire
Saint Giles
12th-century church buildings in England